Sunfish Lake is a lake in Dakota County, in the U.S. state of Minnesota.

Sunfish Lake was named for the sunfish native to its waters.

See also
List of lakes in Minnesota

References

Lakes of Minnesota
Lakes of Dakota County, Minnesota